Christopher Roper (b. Dec. 1561 d. 16 Apr. 1622) was a British aristocrat and member of the House of Roper who became the second Baron Teynham in 1618, after the death of his father, John Roper, 1st Baron Teynham.

The Roper family is an English aristocratic family that can be traced back to 1066 following the Norman Conquest by residing in Derbyshire. Members of the family have held three hereditary titles: Viscount of Baltinglass, Baron Dacre of Glanton, and Baron of Teynham.

Early life 
Christopher was the eldest son of John Roper, of Lynsted, Kent, and his wife Elizabeth Parke. The Ropers (whose original surname had been Musard) were an old Kentish family with strong Catholic connections.

Family estates
The estates owned by the Roper family in the United Kingdom include Hyde and Charlton, Bradford, Pylewell Park, Candelwick, Galway Estates and Trimdon Estates. Additional estates include Saint Dunstans, Chestfeild, Cheselherst, Brambiltighe, and Modingham among others. Kent Estates were acquired in 15th century by Lord John Roper. Galway estates (181 acres) were acquired in 19th century by Sir Henry Roper.

Present
In 1788, Henry Francis Roper, the 14th Baron of Teynham inherited his cousin’s John Barnewall Curzon’s wealth and estate at Water Perry, Northamptonshire when he died. Henry legally added his name to his by Royal Licence and joined House of Roper and House of Curzon in his honour and became Henry Francis Roper-Curzon. Today, his descendants such as John Roper-Curzon, David Roper-Curzon, and Harry Roper-Curzon still go by both names.

References 

1561 births
1622 deaths
2
People from the Borough of Swale
People from Lynsted